Ryan Scott Mitchell (born 24 April 1977) is an Australian breaststroke swimmer of the 1990s, who won a silver medal at the 2000 Summer Olympics in Sydney as part of the 4×100-metre medley relay team. Ryan began his swimming career in Port Augusta, where the Ryan Mitchell municipal swimming center is named after him today.

Early competitions
Growing up in Adelaide and being coached by Glenn Beringen at the South Australian Sports Institute, Mitchell made his debut at the 1994 Commonwealth Games in Victoria, British Columbia, Canada. He was the 1995 silver medalist in the 200-metre breaststroke at the world short course championships in Rio de Janeiro.  He won selection to the national team for the 1996 Summer Olympics in Atlanta, after dead-heating with Phil Rogers to win the 200-metre breaststroke at the Australian Championships. In December of same year, Mirchell broke the world record for Men's 4×100-metre medley relay and the Australian & Commonwealth Shortcourse record for 200-metre breaststroke. He swam slower at the Olympics, finishing in eleventh place.

Silver at the 2000 Olympics
At the 1998 World Aquatics Championships in Perth, Western Australia, Mitchell finished fifth in the 200-metre breaststroke and then won silver at the 1998 Commonwealth Games in Kuala Lumpur, behind fellow Australian Simon Cowley, who won both breaststroke events. He gained selection to the 2000 Summer Olympics in Sydney after winning the 200-metre event and finishing third in the 100-metre event.

At the Olympics, he finished eighth in the 200-metre breaststroke. After Australia's only 100-metre breaststroker Phil Rogers put in a poor performance in the individual event, Australian head coach Don Talbot dropped Rogers and Mitchell swam in the heats of the 4×100-metre medley relay, even though he was not originally selected in the 100m breaststroke. Mitchell was replaced in the final by Regan Harrison (who came fourth in the 200-metre breaststroke), who combined with Matt Welsh, Geoff Huegill and Michael Klim to claim silver, behind the Americans who broke the world record.

Leadership role
In March 2002, Mitchell was appointed Chairman of the Australian Swimmers’ Commission, a professional association promoting the increasingly professional sport of swimming in that continent. Under his leadership, the Commission appointed its first General Manager on 28 July 2003 and the Australian Swimmers Association was officially incorporated on 24 September 2003. At this time the ASA expanded its Board to a ten-member Executive Committee of both current and former Australian swimmers. Mitchell continued to lead the organization until October 2009.

See also
 List of Commonwealth Games medallists in swimming (men)
 List of Olympic medalists in swimming (men)

External links
 ABC profile

1977 births
Living people
Australian male breaststroke swimmers
Olympic swimmers of Australia
Olympic silver medalists for Australia
Swimmers at the 2000 Summer Olympics
Medalists at the FINA World Swimming Championships (25 m)
Swimmers at the 1996 Summer Olympics
Medalists at the 2000 Summer Olympics
Olympic silver medalists in swimming
Commonwealth Games medallists in swimming
People from Port Augusta
Sportsmen from South Australia
Commonwealth Games silver medallists for Australia
Swimmers at the 1994 Commonwealth Games
Swimmers at the 1998 Commonwealth Games
South Australian Sports Institute alumni
Medallists at the 1998 Commonwealth Games